Negros Oriental's 3rd congressional district is one of the three congressional districts of the Philippines in the province of Negros Oriental. It has been represented in the House of Representatives since 1987. The district consists of the southernmost parts of the province that were previously included in Negros Oriental's 2nd district. It contains the city of Bayawan and the municipalities immediately to the south and west of the provincial capital city, Dumaguete, namely Bacong, Basay, Dauin, Santa Catalina, Siaton, Valencia and Zamboanguita. It is currently represented in the 19th Congress by Arnolfo Teves Jr. of the Nationalist People's Coalition (NPC).

Representation history

Election results

2022

2019

2016

2013

2010

See also
Legislative districts of Negros Oriental

References

Congressional districts of the Philippines
Politics of Negros Oriental
1987 establishments in the Philippines
Congressional districts of Central Visayas
Constituencies established in 1987